Aberfeldy may refer to:

Places

Aberfeldy, Victoria, Australia
Aberfeldy, Ontario, Canada
Aberfeldy Village, London, England
Aberfeldy, Perth and Kinross, Scotland
Aberfeldy, Free State, South Africa

Other uses
Aberfeldy (band), a Scottish indie/chamber pop band
Aberfeldy (whisky), a brand of Scottish Malt Whisky
Aberfeldy River, Victoria, Australia

See also
Aberfeldie, Victoria, Australia, a suburb of Melbourne